State Savings Bank is a historic building located in Quasqueton, Iowa, United States.  It was originally built as a three-story warehouse and commercial sales building in 1852. In 1902 it was significantly altered. The building was reduced to two stories, and it was given a completely new facade in the Romanesque Revival style. Since that time it has housed a bank and a series of retail stores. The building thought to be unique in Buchanan County in that its facade is completely composed of brick, while other Romanesque Revival commercial buildings have store fronts of cast iron, wood, and glass. It was listed on the National Register of Historic Places in 1999.

References

Commercial buildings completed in 1902
Buildings and structures in Buchanan County, Iowa
National Register of Historic Places in Buchanan County, Iowa
Bank buildings on the National Register of Historic Places in Iowa
Romanesque Revival architecture in Iowa